Thor Peak is in the northern Teton Range, Grand Teton National Park, in the U.S. state of Wyoming. The summit is the eighth-highest in the Teton Range. Several semi-permanent snowfields as well as the Triple Glaciers are located on the east and northern slopes of the mountain. While the easiest route up the mountain, the south slope, is only rated a class 4, the mountain's remoteness and difficulty of approach make it a challenging mountain to summit.

References

Mountains of Grand Teton National Park
Mountains of Wyoming
Mountains of Teton County, Wyoming